Jhonatan Luiz da Siqueira (born 8 May 1991) is a Brazilian professional footballer who plays as a goalkeeper for Primeira Liga club Rio Ave.

Club career
Born in São Miguel do Oeste, Jhonatan joined the youth setup of Guarani at the age of fifteen. Two years later, he switched to the Joinville academy and was promoted to the senior team in 2010. In 2015, he joined Operarário on loan for the Campeonato Paranaense season. In March, he scored a goal against Nacional in a 2–1 away victory. During his loan spell, he went on to win the competition with the club.

On 7 July 2017, Jhonatan moved abroad and signed for Portuguese first tier club Moreirense on a two-year contract.

On 16 July 2021, he joined Rio Ave on a season-long loan.

References

External links
 
 

1991 births
Living people
Association football goalkeepers
Brazilian footballers
Joinville Esporte Clube players
Operário Ferroviário Esporte Clube players
Moreirense F.C. players
Vitória S.C. players
Vitória S.C. B players
Rio Ave F.C. players
Campeonato Brasileiro Série A players
Campeonato Brasileiro Série B players
Campeonato Brasileiro Série C players
Primeira Liga players
Liga Portugal 2 players
Campeonato de Portugal (league) players
Brazilian expatriate footballers
Expatriate footballers in Portugal
Brazilian expatriate sportspeople in Portugal